Alexander Fisher (14 March 1908 – 6 October 1968) was an Australian cricketer. He played in three first-class matches for Queensland between 1934 and 1936.

See also
 List of Queensland first-class cricketers

References

External links
 

1908 births
1968 deaths
Australian cricketers
Queensland cricketers
Cricketers from Queensland